The women's 1500 metres in short track speed skating at the 2010 Winter Olympics was held on 20 February at the Pacific Coliseum.

Results

Heats

Semifinals

Finals

Final B (Classification round)

Final A (Medal round)

External links
 2010 Winter Olympics results: Ladies' 1500 m, from http://www.vancouver2010.com/; retrieved 2010-02-19.

Women's short track speed skating at the 2010 Winter Olympics